An Unfinished Piece for Mechanical Piano is a 1977 Soviet drama film directed by Nikita Mikhalkov, who also co-stars.  It is based on Anton Chekhov's Platonov, as well as several of his other short stories. It was filmed at Pushchino-Na-Oke (Artsebashev Estate), Pushchino, Russia, which was dilapidated in the film and is now abandoned.

Plot
Some members of the gentry gather at a house in rural Russia in the early twentieth century.  As the day progresses, relationships develop, and the question arises of where these new relationships will lead.

Cast
 Aleksandr Kalyagin: Mikhail Vassilyevich Platonov
 Elena Solovey: Sophia Yegorovna
 Yevgeniya Glushenko: Sashenka
 Antonina Shuranova: Anna Petrovna Voinitseva
 Yuri Bogatyryov: Sergey Pavlovich Voinitsev
 Oleg Tabakov: Pavel Petrovich Shcherbuk
 Nikolai Pastukhov: Porfiry Semyonovich Glagolyev
 Pavel Kadochnikov: Ivan Ivanovich Triletsky
 Nikita Mikhalkov: Nikolai Ivanovich Triletsky
 Anatoli Romashin: Gerasim Kuzmich Petrin
 Natalya Nazarova: Verochka
 Kseniya Minina: Lizochka
 Sergey Nikonenko: Yakov
 Sergei Guryev: Petechka (as Seryozha Guryev)

Reception

Critical response
An Unfinished Piece for Mechanical Piano has an approval rating of 86% on review aggregator website Rotten Tomatoes, based on 7 reviews, and an average rating of 8.00/10.

The Japanese filmmaker Akira Kurosawa cited this movie as one of his 100 favorite films.

References

External links
 

1977 films
1977 drama films
1970s Russian-language films
Films about social class
Films based on works by Anton Chekhov
Films set in Russia
Films set in the 1900s
Films set in country houses
Films set in the Russian Empire
Films shot in Moscow Oblast
Films directed by Nikita Mikhalkov
Films scored by Eduard Artemyev
Soviet drama films
Mosfilm films